Steven Barry Smith (born 18 October 1961) is a former Australian and New South Wales cricketer.  He played in three Test matches and 28 One Day Internationals between 1983 and 1985, taking part in tours of Sri Lanka, the West Indies, and India.

He joined the Australian rebel tours to South Africa in 1985–86 and 1986–87. He made 1163 runs at 52.86 and was named one of South Africa's Cricketers of the Year.

Career
Steve Smith made his first grade debut for Bankstown when he was 17. His mother's cousin was test batsman Norm O'Neill, but he claimed a greater influence on his game was his father, who was a grade cricketer. He says a crucial stage in his development as a batsman came when he was 20 and moved to opener. Scores of 162 and 215 not out at the beginning of the 1981–82 season saw him make his first class debut for New South Wales that summer. He made 35 on his first class debut and he ended up getting 245 runs at an average of 40.

Smith's good form continued the following season, making a top score of 263 in the Sheffield Shield, including 117 in a session. He was selected in Australia's one day side and scored 117 off 130 balls in only his third game, against New Zealand. These efforts led to him being picked in the Australian squad to tour Sri Lanka in 1983.

Smith scored consistently throughout the 1983–84 domestic season, making 480 first class runs at an average of 43.63. He established himself as an excellent one day international batsman, scoring 106 against Pakistan and making two half centuries against the West Indies. He was picked to tour the West Indies in early 1984. There was some doubt he would be able to go after dislocating his shoulder during the one day finals but he recovered in time.

Test career
Smith started the tour of the West Indies brilliantly, scoring a century in each innings in his first match, a draw against Guyana – the first time that feat had been accomplished in that country in ten years. He won the man of the match award and followed this up with 60 in the 1st one day international. Smith's good form with the bat, along with Roger Woolley's poor work behind the stumps in tour games, prompted the selectors to pick Smith as opener and move Wayne B. Phillips down the order and play him as wicketkeeper.

Smith's first test was not a memorable one for him – he scored 3 and 12, and was dismissed twice by Joel Garner. However he followed this with a useful knock of 27, batting at number three, which helped set up an Australian victory in the 2nd ODI. He was meant to play in the second test, but fell ill and was replaced at the last minute by Dean Jones.

Smith recovered in time for the next tour game, against Barbados, and hit 66 in the second innings. He was picked in the 3rd test but failed twice again, getting out both times to Malcolm Marshall.

He was dropped for the 4th test, then hit a vein of form, scoring a century against the Windward Islands, 84 against Jamaica, and 50 in a one day international. Smith was recalled to the test team for the final test. He made 9 in the first innings and was injured so unable to bat in the second.

Smith toured India in 1984, scoring a half century and impressing Sunil Gavaskar with the quality of his fielding. He played several one day games for Australia over the 1984–85 season, making three half centuries, and was only let go from the team due to injury.

However he was unable to work his way back into the test team, failing to score a first class century all summer.

South Africa
Smith had been approached by Graham Yallop during the India tour to see if he was interested in touring South Africa with an unofficial Australian XI. After he missed selection in the Australian sides to tour Sharjah or England in early 1985, Smith asked to be considered for the team going to South Africa. He signed to play for two seasons, 1985–86 and 1986–87.

When the news of the tour broke, tour organiser Bruce Francis claims Smith was one of several players Kerry Packer wanted to buy back into official Australian cricket, along with Dirk Wellham, Wayne B. Phillips and Graeme Wood. Packer succeeded in persuading those three not to go to South Africa, but not Smith. Francis said he thought Smith wanted to go on the tour partly for the money – $200,000 after tax – but also because it gave him the chance to show he was not a one-day specialist.

During the first South African tour Smith only played one "test", due to injury, but made the most of it, scoring a century in the first innings. He also made two half centuries in the one day internationals.

During the second tour, Smith scored centuries in the 3rd and 4th unofficial test matches. He scored more first class runs on that trip than any other Australian batsman.

Smith returned to Australia for two seasons but was unable to recapture his previous form, with a highest first class score of 84 over two summers. He moved to South Africa and played for Transvaal for two seasons, then retired from first class cricket.

Post-playing career
Smith ran an indoor cricket centre, became a batting coach for Bankstown as well as a New South Wales selector.

References

Bibliography

External links
 

1961 births
Living people
Australia One Day International cricketers
Australia Test cricketers
New South Wales cricketers
Gauteng cricketers
Australian cricketers